Gorintaku may refer to:

 Gorintaku (1979 film)
 Gorintaku (2008 film), a Telugu film directed by V. R. Prathap
 The Telugu name for the plant Lawsonia inermis
Gorintaku a serial